Cine Ideal, also known under the commercial name Yelmo Cines Ideal is a cinema in Madrid, Spain. It specialises in the screening of films in their original version.

History

Origins 
The venue was built on the elongated plot hitherto occupied by some barracks belonging to the Ministry of Development. It opened in May 1916. It boasted a reported maximum capacity, according to the journalistic chronicles of the time, of up to 3,000 spectators. In 1932, it was briefly used for stage performances. It was refurbished in 1958. Specialised in genre films in the late 20th century, it closed down towards 1985.

Multiplex 
In 1990, after the purchase by Yelmo Cines, the interior was revamped into a multiplex with 9 screens distributed on two floors, henceforth becoming a linchpin in Madrid for the screening of films in their original version. From April to November 2017, the venue was closed due to refurbishing works that included accessibility improvements (a lift between the two floors).

Informational notes

References 

Cinemas in Madrid
Buildings and structures in Embajadores neighborhood, Madrid
Art Nouveau architecture in Spain